Cadiz is a genus of leaf beetles in the subfamily Chrysomelinae, found in North America. It contains only one species, Cadiz hardyi, which was described from the Cadiz Dunes in San Bernardino County, California.

References

Further reading

 
 
 

Chrysomelinae
Beetles of the United States
Articles created by Qbugbot
Beetles described in 1992